The 3rd Set Decorators Society of America Awards honored the best set decorators in film and television in 2022. The nominations for the film categories were announced on January 5, 2023, while the winners were announced via YouTube on February 14, 2023. The dates for the nominations and winners of the television categories are yet to be announced.

The SDSA Honors will take place on April 23, 2023, at the Sheraton Universal Hotel. Set Decorator Mary Ann Biddle will be presented the SDSA Earl Cooperman Lifetime Achievement Award. The event will confer the Humanitarian, Hall of Fame, Business Member of the Year and Chair Awards, and recognize the recipients of the SDSA Awards for Film and Television. The SDSA COC Silent Art Auction will once again be a part of the SDSA Honors, online and in-person, to benefit Set for Life, a charitable organization that creates safe and comfortable homes for youths aging out of foster care and youths experiencing homelessness. Three scholarships will also be awarded in honor of Leslie Frankenheimer (sponsored by Lennie Marvin's Prop Heaven), Robinson Royce (sponsored by RC Vintage), and Marvin March (sponsored by SDSA and IATSE Local 44).

Winners and nominees

Film

References

External links
 

2022 film awards
2022 television awards
2022 in American cinema
2022 in American television